Tiger Child ( Tora no ko) was the first IMAX movie ever made. It was directed by Canadian filmmaker Donald Brittain and produced by Roman Kroitor and Ichi Ichikawa. It premiered at Expo '70 in Osaka, Japan at the Fuji Group Pavilion.

References

External links

1970 films
IMAX short films
Films directed by Donald Brittain
1970 in Japan
Japanese short films
World's fair films
Expo '70
1970 short films
1970s Japanese films